Drevvassbygda is a village in the municipality of Vefsn in Nordland county, Norway. The village is the location of Drevvatn Station on the Nordland Line, between the town of Mosjøen and the village of Bjerka.

References

External links
List of stations on the Nordlandsbane (Jernbaneverket)

Vefsn
Villages in Nordland